Onofre Agustín Marimón (19 December 1923 – 31 July 1954) was a racing driver from Zárate, Buenos Aires, Argentina. He participated in 11 Formula One World Championship Grands Prix, debuting on 1 July 1951. He achieved two podiums, and scored a total of 8  championship points.

Marimón was killed on 31 July 1954 during practice for the 1954 German Grand Prix, becoming the first driver to be fatally injured at a World Championship Grand Prix other than the Indianapolis 500. His Maserati left the Nürburgring race course at the Breidscheid curve near the Adenauer Bridge after he lost control attempting to improve his qualifying time. He died at the bottom of a steep and treacherous incline. He was going fast on a downgrade but failed to negotiate a sharp turn at the bottom. Marimón impacted a ditch, his Maserati shearing off a tree and rolling over a number of times. He was pinned underneath the car as it came to rest on its top with the wheels spinning in the air. Marimón was given the last rites by a Catholic priest before dying a few minutes after rescue workers freed him. It was thought that his braking unit failed.

Marimón's death trimmed the Maserati team to four drivers. His practice times had not been satisfactory enough for him to make the top 5 for the
1954 German Grand Prix. His best time was 21.3 seconds behind the record time of 9:50.1 set by Juan Manuel Fangio.

Complete Formula One World Championship results 
(key) (Races in italics indicate fastest lap)

Complete 24 Hours of Le Mans results

Non-Championship Formula One results 
(key) (Races in bold indicate pole position; Races in italics indicate fastest lap)

References

External links
 Profile on OldRacingCars.com
  Biography of Onofre Marimón (Funo!)

Argentine racing drivers
Argentine Formula One drivers
Scuderia Milano Formula One drivers
Maserati Formula One drivers
People from Zárate, Buenos Aires
Racing drivers who died while racing
Sportspeople from Buenos Aires Province
Argentine people of Spanish descent
1923 births
1954 deaths
Sport deaths in Germany
24 Hours of Le Mans drivers
World Sportscar Championship drivers